James Rael (born 25 March 1992) is an Irish rugby union player. Rael played as a hooker. He most recently played professionally for Irish provincial side Connacht Rugby. Before joining Connacht, Rael was part of the academy at Munster and played his club rugby with Garryowen.

Career

Connacht
Rael started his career in his native province of Munster, being part of the team's academy and played for the amateur club Garryowen in the All-Ireland League. Ahead of the 2013–14 season, Rael signed a one-year development contract with fellow Irish provincial side Connacht. He made his debut for Connacht on 28 September 2013, coming off the bench against Ospreys in the 2013–14 Pro12.

In April 2014, it was announced that Rael failed to secure a renewed contract and he would be leaving the province at the end of the season.

Ireland
Rael has represented his country at under-age international level. He earned a total of nine caps for Ireland Under-20's, scoring a single try. Rael represented the team at the 2012 IRB Junior World Championship.

References

External links
Connacht Profile
Ireland U20 Profile

Living people
1992 births
Irish rugby union players
Connacht Rugby players
Rugby union hookers
Rugby union players from Limerick (city)